The Constitutional Court of Bulgaria is in charge of reviewing the constitutionality of laws and statutes brought before it, as well as the compliance of these laws with international treaties that the Government has signed. The 12 members of the Constitutional Court serve a nine-year term. Parliament elects 1/3 of them. President elects 1/3.

List of chairmen

See also 
2013 student protest in Bulgaria

External links 

 

Government of Bulgaria
Politics of Bulgaria
Bulgaria
Judiciary of Bulgaria